A constitutional referendum was held in the Democratic Republic of the Congo between 4 and 16 June 1967. The new constitution created a unitary state with a presidential system, whereby the president would be selected by a unicameral National Assembly and then approved by a referendum. It also abolished presidential term limits, limited the number of political parties to two, and gave women the vote.

The proposed constitution was approved by 97.8% of voters.

Results

References

Referendums in the Democratic Republic of the Congo
1967 referendums
1967 in the Democratic Republic of the Congo
Constitutional referendums